Microlophus grayii, commonly known as the Floreana lava lizard, is a species of lava lizard in the family Tropiduridae. The species is endemic to the Galapagos island of Floreana.

Taxonomy
The species, Microlophus grayii, is commonly assigned to the genus Microlophus but has been assigned to the genus Tropidurus. It has also been assigned to the family Tropiduridae.

Etymology
The specific name, grayii, is in honor of British herpetologist John Edward Gray.

References

Further reading
Bell T (1843). The Zoology of the Voyage of H.M.S. Beagle Under the Command of Captain Fitzroy, R.N., during the years 1832 to 1836. Edited and Superintended by Charles Darwin ... Naturalist to the Expedition. Part 5. Reptiles. London: Smith, Elder and Company. vi + 51 pp. + Plates 1-20. (Leiocephalus grayii, new species, p. 24 + Plate 14, figure 1). (in English and Latin).
Boulenger GA (1885). Catalogue of the Lizards in the British Museum (Natural History). Second Edition. Volume II. Iguanidæ ... London: Trustees of the British Museum. (Taylor and Francis, printers). xiii + 497 pp. + Plates I-XXIV. (Tropidurus grayi, pp. 172–173).
Frost DR (1992). "Phylogenetic Analysis and Taxonomy of the Tropidurus Group of Lizards (Iguania: Tropiduridae)". American Museum Novitates (3033): 1-68. (Microlophus grayii, p. 48).

grayii
Endemic reptiles of the Galápagos Islands
Lizards of South America
Reptiles of Ecuador
Reptiles described in 1843
Taxa named by Thomas Bell (zoologist)